The following is a list of the 21 cantons of the Morbihan department, in France, following the French canton reorganisation which came into effect in March 2015:

 Auray
 Gourin
 Grand-Champ
 Guer
 Guidel
 Hennebont
 Lanester
 Lorient-1
 Lorient-2
 Moréac
 Muzillac
 Ploemeur
 Ploërmel
 Pluvigner
 Pontivy
 Questembert
 Quiberon
 Séné
 Vannes-1
 Vannes-2
 Vannes-3

References